Richard Theodore Haik Sr. (born March 1, 1950) is a former United States district judge of the United States District Court for the Western District of Louisiana.

Background

One of four children of Theodore Michael Haik, Sr., and the former Margaret Hannie, both deceased, Richard Haik was born in Lafayette but reared in New Iberia, Louisiana. He graduated in 1968 from Catholic High School in New Iberia, where he was a three-year letterman in football and an all-state defensive end/fullback. In 1971, he received a Bachelor of Science from the University of Louisiana at Lafayette, then named the University of Southwestern Louisiana, where he was a four-year letterman in football for the Ragin' Cajuns. He received his Juris Doctor in 1975 from Loyola University New Orleans College of Law. He was in the private practice of law in New Iberia from 1975 to 1984. From 1971 to 1978, he was a member of the Louisiana Army National Guard; from 1980 to 1984, he was a reserve captain in the United States Army.

Personal

Haik and his wife, Kathleen, have three children. Elizabeth, Richard, and Mary Carolyn. Kathleen and Haik have 9 grandchildren.

Judicial career

In 1984, Haik was elected as a state district judge for the 16th Judicial District in New Iberia to the seat vacated by John Malcolm Duhé Jr., who became a federal district judge for the Western District of Louisiana under appointment from then U.S. President Ronald W. Reagan. Haik served on the state court until 1991.

On April 11, 1991, Judge Haik was nominated to the United States District Court for the Western District of Louisiana by President George H. W. Bush to the seat vacated by John Malcolm Duhé Jr. This was the second time that Haik assumed a bench vacated by Judge Duhé. Instead Duhé was elevated to the United States Court of Appeals for the Fifth Circuit in New Orleans. Judge Haik was confirmed by the United States Senate on May 24, 1991, received his commission six days later, and was sworn in as a federal judge on June 14, 1991. He served as Chief Judge of the district court from 2002 until June 1, 2009. He assumed senior status on March 6, 2015. He retired from active service on January 15, 2016.

References

External links
 
 Website of the Western District of Louisiana federal courts
 Interview with Judge Haik

1950 births
Living people
American people of Lebanese descent
Judges of the United States District Court for the Western District of Louisiana
United States district court judges appointed by George H. W. Bush
20th-century American judges
Louisiana state court judges
United States Army officers
Louisiana lawyers
Loyola University New Orleans College of Law alumni
Politicians from Lafayette, Louisiana
People from New Iberia, Louisiana
University of Louisiana at Lafayette alumni